Mário Rui Silva Duarte  (born 27 May 1991), known as Mário Rui, is a Portuguese footballer who plays as a left-back for  club Napoli and the Portugal national team.

Formed at Benfica, he spent most of his professional career in Italy, making over 200 appearances in Serie A for Empoli, Roma and Napoli, and winning the Coppa Italia with the last of those clubs in 2020.

Mário Rui was part of the Portugal squad at the 2018 World Cup.

Club career

Early years and Empoli
Born in Sines, Setúbal District, Mário Rui started his career at local Vasco da Gama Atlético Clube. He then played for the youth teams of Sporting CP, Valencia CF and S.L. Benfica, being signed by Parma F.C. in summer 2011 and being loaned immediately to fellow Italians A.S. Gubbio 1910; he joined the Serie B club following that year's FIFA U-20 World Cup, with the international transfer certificate arriving on 2 September.

In June 2012, Parma signed Mário Rui for €595,000 on a five-year contract (paid to Gubbio), effectively on 1 July. Also that month, he joined Spezia Calcio on a temporary deal for free.

Mário Rui moved to Empoli F.C. on 28 June 2013, for €550,000. He contributed 26 matches in his first season, as his new team returned to Serie A after a six-year absence.

In June 2014, Parma gave up the remaining 50% rights of Mário Rui to Empoli. He first appeared in the Italian top flight on 31 August, coming on as a 66th-minute substitute for Elseid Hysaj in a 2–0 away loss against Udinese Calcio.

Roma
On 8 July 2016, Mário Rui was signed by A.S. Roma in a temporary deal for a loan fee of €3 million (plus €1.5 million in bonuses), with a conditional obligation to sign him outright for an additional €6 million. He started the season injured, only making his debut on 19 January 2017 when he played 78 minutes in a 4–0 home win over U.C. Sampdoria in the Coppa Italia.

Napoli
On 13 July 2017, Mário Rui joined S.S.C. Napoli on an initial €3.75 million loan; depending on the achievement of certain sporting targets, the club would have an obligation to buy him outright for a further €5.5 million. He made his debut in the seventh game of the season at home to Cagliari Calcio on 1 October, as a late substitute in a 3–0 win. His first goal in the Italian top division came the following 10 February, helping the hosts to defeat S.S. Lazio 4–1. He became the starting left-back after Faouzi Ghoulam's knee injury in November, and in April his agent threatened to find him a new team if he would not retain that place after the Algeria international's recovery.

Mário Rui played the first 81 minutes of the 2020 Coppa Italia Final on 17 June, which Napoli won on penalties after a goalless draw with Juventus FC. On 6 August, he extended his contract to 2025, with an annual salary of €2.5 million. He and Ghoulam were both dropped by manager Gennaro Gattuso for the 1–0 victory at Bologna F.C. 1909 on 8 November for breaking curfew.

International career
All youth levels comprised, Mário Rui earned 51 caps for Portugal. During the 2011 FIFA U-20 World Cup he appeared in five out of seven matches for the eventual finalists, scoring his only goal for his country in a 1–0 group stage victory over New Zealand. His debut with the under-21 team arrived on 5 September 2011, when he played the entirety of a 1–0 friendly defeat of France. 

In March 2018, Mário Rui was called by full side manager Fernando Santos for exhibition games with Egypt and the Netherlands as a replacement for the injured Fábio Coentrão, making his debut against the latter by playing the full 90 minutes in the 3–0 loss in Switzerland. He was included in the final 23-man squad for the 2018 FIFA World Cup in Russia. 

In September 2022, Santos called Mário Rui up for the first time in nearly two years in place of the injured Raphaël Guerreiro, for UEFA Nations League fixtures against the Czech Republic and Spain; he started the first fixture in Prague, a 4–0 win. The following month, he was one of 55 players pre-selected for the 2022 World Cup in Qatar.

Career statistics

Club

International

Honours
Napoli
Coppa Italia: 2019–20

Portugal U20
FIFA U-20 World Cup runner-up: 2011

Portugal
UEFA Nations League: 2018–19

Orders
 Knight of the Order of Prince Henry

References

External links
Napoli official profile

1991 births
Living people
People from Sines
Sportspeople from Setúbal District
Portuguese footballers
Association football defenders
Liga Portugal 2 players
S.L. Benfica footballers
C.D. Fátima players
Serie A players
Serie B players
Parma Calcio 1913 players
A.S. Gubbio 1910 players
Spezia Calcio players
Empoli F.C. players
A.S. Roma players
S.S.C. Napoli players
Portugal youth international footballers
Portugal under-21 international footballers
Portugal international footballers
2018 FIFA World Cup players
UEFA Nations League-winning players
Portuguese expatriate footballers
Expatriate footballers in Spain
Expatriate footballers in Italy
Portuguese expatriate sportspeople in Spain
Portuguese expatriate sportspeople in Italy